Ragožiai is a village in Jonava district municipality, in Kaunas County, central Lithuania. According to the 2011 census, the town has a population of 302 people.

Villages in Jonava District Municipality